Lee E. Williams Assembly Center is an 8,000-seat multi-purpose arena located on Jackson State University's campus in Jackson, Mississippi. It was built in 1981 and is home to the Jackson State Tigers women's and men's basketball teams.

It will be renovated in a few years by Durrell Design Group, and the renovations are currently in the planning process. The renovations will consist of new signage added, blue, red and white added to the exterior, renovation of the men's and women's locker rooms and addition of player lounges for men's and women's basketball.

See also
 List of NCAA Division I basketball arenas

References

External links 

 Lee E. Williams Athletic Center at JSU Athletics

College basketball venues in the United States
Basketball venues in Mississippi
Jackson State Tigers and Lady Tigers basketball
Buildings and structures in Jackson, Mississippi
Sports venues completed in 1981
1981 establishments in Mississippi